The Parliament of Canada has exclusive jurisdiction to regulate matters relating to bankruptcy and insolvency, by virtue of Section 91(2) of the Constitution Act, 1867. It has passed the following statutes as a result:

 The Bankruptcy and Insolvency Act ("BIA") 
 The Companies' Creditors Arrangements Act ("CCAA") 
 The Farm Debt Mediation Act 
 The  Wage Earner Protection Program Act 
 The Winding-Up and Restructuring Act (which essentially applies only to financial institutions under federal jurisdiction) 

In applying these statutes, provincial law has important consequences. Section 67(1)(b) of the BIA provides that "any property that as against the bankrupt is exempt from execution or seizure under any laws applicable in the province within which the property is situated and within which the bankrupt resides".

Provincial legislation under the property and civil rights power of the Constitution Act, 1867 regulates the resolution of financial difficulties that occur before the onset of insolvency. Notable legislation is in effect for governing:

 creation of security interests (with notable caveats)
 absconding debtors
 bulk sales (in Ontario only)
 fraudulent conveyances
 relief of creditors
 seizure of assets
 assignments and preferences

Administration of insolvency law

The Office of the Superintendent of Bankruptcy is charged with the administration of the BIA and the CCAA. All records relating to matters under those Acts are accessible at their website. The Office also licenses insolvency trustees (LITs), who are authorized to:

 administer estates of bankrupts
 handle consumer and commercial proposals in order to forestall an assignment in bankruptcy
 act as a monitor under the CCAA
 act as a receiver under Part XI of the BIA, to take possession and administer property as a consequence of provisions in a security agreement or by virtue of any federal or provincial law that authorizes the appointment of a receiver or receiver-manager

See also
Commercial insolvency in Canada
Consumer bankruptcy in Canada
Bankruptcy and Insolvency Act

References